Mazahir Uloom is an Islamic seminary in Saharanpur, India. The following is a list of notable alumni of the seminary. For Mazahir Uloom Jadeed alumni, please see that article.

See more
List of Darul Uloom Deoband alumni

References

Deobandi-related lists
Mazahir Uloom
Mazahir Uloom alumni
Deobandis